WALTIC, the Writers’ and Literary Translators’ International Congress, titled "The Value of Words", is a bi-annual international literary congress founded and owned by The Swedish Writers’ Union. Having its premier launch in Stockholm between 29 June and 2 July 2008, WALTIC’s aim and thematic scope is divided in accordance to three key elements: Increase literacy, Safeguard freedom of expression, and Strengthen authors’ rights.

Chairman of The Swedish Writers' Union and President of WALTIC 2008: Mats Söderlund. Program Committee: Gabriella Håkansson and Henrik C. Enbohm.
WALTIC 2008 honorary guest was poet Tomas Tranströmer. "I am glad to participate in the WALTIC congress because it is devoted to democracy, and the act of reading is a very good example of pure democracy in action," said writer Philip Pullman when asked about his participation in the 2008 congress.

Speakers

WALTIC 2008 keynote speakers were Mia Couto and Nawal El-Saadawi.

Among the invited speakers present included:
 
 Türker Armaner
 Antonia Arslan
 Yusuf Azemoun
 Karin Barber
 Ann Louise Bardach
 Abdelkader Benali
 Charles Bernstein
 Calixthe Beyala
 Giannina Braschi
 David Brookshaw
 Mircea Cărtărescu
 Mauro Covacich
 Tsitsi Dangarembga
 Assia Djebar
 Gamal el-Ghitany
 Horace Engdahl
 James English
 Filip Florian
 Jean-Claude Guédon
 Josef Haslinger
 Rafael Hernández
 Ho Anh Thai
 Uzodinma Iweala
 Clara Janés
 Eileen Julien
 Jonas Hassen Khemiri
 Jamaica Kincaid
 Antije Krog
 Leevi Lehto
 Eileen Julien
 Henning Mankell
 Ana Menendez
 Gcina Mhlope
 Rosa Montero
 Bharati Mukherjee
 Herta Müller
 Simone Murray
 Sonia Nimr
 Saliha Paker
 Elena Poniatowska
 Philip Pullman
 Laura Restrepo
 Rodrigo Rey Rosa
 Hans Rosling
 Alfian Bin Sa’at
 Gayatri Chakravorty Spivak
 Dava Sobel
 Muniz Sodré
 Saša Stanišic
 Krister Stoor
 Farzaneh Taheri
 Shaun Tan
 Yoko Tawada
 Dubravka Ugrešic
 Leonardo Valencia
 Binyavanga Wainaina (not present due to illness)
 Frank Westerman
 Wu Ming

WALTIC Resolution 

During WALTIC 2008 a resolution was adopted stating that: "Literature is a source of knowledge with the strength to empower entire populations", hence underlining that "Literacy, freedom of expression and authors' rights are keys to the never-ending pursuit of truth, for the development of societies based on democratic and humanitarian values as well as for the individual aspiring to express his or her unique knowledge and experience", and moreover, that "Increasing literacy is essential to improvement of welfare and democratic processes, and to the safeguarding of human rights." The resolution also noted that "Safeguarding freedom of expression makes it possible for both the ordinary citizen and decision makers to better understand the world around them and thus to make informed decisions".

References

External links
Article in Ny Tid 
Article in Dagens Nyheter 
WALTIC Resolution

International conferences in Sweden
Swedish culture
Biennial events

sv:Sveriges Författarförbund#WALTIC